Protacanthamoeba bohemica is a species of Acanthamoebidae.

See also
 Protoacanthamoeba

References

Discosea
Amoebozoa species